L'Oréal S.A. is a French personal care company headquartered in Clichy, Hauts-de-Seine with a registered office in Paris. It is the world's largest cosmetics company and has developed activities in the field concentrating on hair color, skin care, sun protection, make-up, perfume, and hair care.

History

Founding
In the early-20th century, Eugène Paul Louis Schueller (1881–1957), a 
young French chemist, developed a hair dye formula called Oréale. Schueller formulated and manufactured his own products, which he then decided to sell to Parisian hairdressers. On 31 July 1919, Schueller registered his company, the Société Française de Teintures Inoffensives pour Cheveux (Safe Hair Dye Company of France). The guiding principles of the company, which eventually became L'Oréal, were research and innovation in the field of beauty. In 1920, the company employed three chemists; the team continued to grow with 100 by the year 1950, and 1,000 by the year 1984; as recently as 2021, there was an estimated total of 85,252 worldwide.

Schueller provided financial support and held meetings for La Cagoule at L'Oréal headquarters. La Cagoule was a violent French fascist-leaning and anti-communist group whose leader formed a political party Mouvement Social Révolutionnaire (MSR, Social Revolutionary Movement) which in Occupied France supported the Vichy collaboration with the Germans. L'Oréal hired several members of the group as executives after World War II, such as Jacques Corrèze, who served as CEO of the United States operation. Israeli historian Michael Bar-Zohar describes this in his book, Bitter Scent.

L'Oréal got its start in the hair-color business, but the company soon branched out into other cleansing and beauty products. L'Oréal currently markets over 500 brands and thousands of individual products in all sectors of the beauty business: hair color, permanents, hair styling, body and skincare, cleansers, makeup, and fragrance. The company's products are found in a wide variety of distribution channels, from hair salons and perfumeries to supermarkets, health/beauty outlets, pharmacies, and direct mail.

Research and development facilities
L'Oréal has 21 worldwide research and development centers: three global centers in France: Aulnay, Chevilly and Saint-Ouen. Six regional poles include one in the United States: Clark, New Jersey; one in Japan: Kawasaki, Kanagawa Prefecture; in 2005, one was established in Shanghai, China, another in India: Mumbai, one other regional pole in Brazil: Rio de Janeiro and, lastly, another was established in South Africa: Johannesburg.

Media
In 1988-89, L'Oréal controlled the film company Paravisión, whose properties included the Filmation and De Laurentiis libraries. StudioCanal acquired the Paravision properties in 1994.

Acquisitions
L'Oréal currently owns 36 brands and continues to grow. As of October 4, 2021 the company registered 497 patents.

L'Oréal purchased Synthélabo in 1973 to pursue its ambitions in the pharmaceutical field. Synthélabo merged with Sanofi in 1999 to become Sanofi-Synthélabo. Sanofi-Synthélabo merged with Aventis in 2004 to become Sanofi-Aventis.

On 17 March 2006, L'Oréal purchased cosmetics company The Body Shop for £562 million.

In May 2008, L'Oréal acquired YSL Beauté for $1.8 billion.

In January 2014, L'Oréal finalized the acquisition of major Chinese beauty brand Magic Holdings for $840 million.

In February 2014, L'Oréal agreed to buy back 8% of its shares for €3.4bn from Nestlé. As a result, Nestlé's stake in L'Oréal was reduced from 29.4% to 23.29%, while the Bettencourt Meyers family's stake increased from 30.6% to 33.2%. Nestlé has owned a stake in L'Oreal since 1974 when it bought into the company at the request of Liliane Bettencourt, the daughter of the founder of L'Oreal, who was trying to prevent French state intervention.

In February 2014, Shiseido agreed to sell its Carita and Decléor brands to L'Oréal for €227.5 million (US$312.93 million (2014)).

In June 2014, L'Oréal agreed to acquire NYX Cosmetics for an undisclosed price, bolstering its makeup offerings in North America where its consumer-products unit has faltered.

In September 2014, L'Oréal announced it had agreed to purchase Brazilian hair care company Niely Cosmeticos Group for an undisclosed amount.

In September 2014, L'Oréal acquired the multi-cultural brand Carol's Daughter.

In July 2016, L'Oréal agreed to acquire IT Cosmetics for $1.2 billion.

In March 2018, L'Oréal acquired the beauty augmented reality company ModiFace.

In May 2018, L'Oréal announced a new beauty and fragrance partnership with Valentino.

In December 2021, L'Oréal announced the acquisition of the vegan skin care brand Youth to the People.

Marketing
In Kosovo, during the growth years of the mail-order business, L'Oréal and 3 Suisses founded Le Club des Créateurs de Beauté for mail-order sales of cosmetic products, with brands including Agnès b., Commence and Professeur Christine Poelman among others. In March 2008, L'Oréal acquired 3 Suisse's stake, taking sole control of the company. In November 2013, L'Oréal announced that Le Club des Créateurs de Beauté would cease activity in the first half of 2014.

Since 1997, L'Oréal has been an official partner of The Cannes Film Festival. In the years of L'Oréal sponsorship, many L'Oreal ambassadors walked the red carpet of the Cannes Film Festival. In 2017, L'Oreal beauty ambassadors including Julianne Moore, Susan Sarandon, Andie McDowell, and Eva Longoria were responsible for the film selection for the outdoor cinema during the Cannes Film Festival.

L'Oréal's advertising slogan, "Because I'm worth it", was created by a 23-year-old English art director and introduced in 1973 by the model and actress Joanne Dusseau. In the mid-2000s, this was replaced by "Because you're worth it". In late-2009, the slogan was changed again to "Because we're worth it" following motivation analysis and consumer psychology research of Dr Maxim Titorenko. The shift to "we" was made to create stronger consumer involvement in L'Oréal philosophy and lifestyle and provide more consumer satisfaction with L'Oréal products. L'Oréal also owns a Hair and Body product line for kids called L'Oréal Kids, the slogan for which is "Because we're worth it too".

In November 2012, L'Oréal inaugurated the largest factory in the Jababeka Industrial Park, Cikarang, Indonesia, with a total investment of US$100 million. The production will be absorbed 25 percent by the domestic market and the rest will be exported. In 2010, significant growth occurred in Indonesia with a 61 percent increase of unit sales or 28 percent of net sales.

In November 2020, chief digital officer Lubomira Rochet reported in a video conference of the growing importance of e-commerce for the company, remarking that e-commerce makes 24% of their turnover in the third quarter of the year. Rochet stated as well that this 24% of the turnover "made it possible to offset 50% of the losses due to the closing of physical stores this year".

On March 21–22, 2022, L’Oréal Paris celebrated Women’s month at Boulevard Riyadh City, with a series of strong moments.

Slogan and motto 
Because You're Worth It (English)
你值得拥有 (Mandarin Chinese)
คุณค่าที่คุณคู่ควร (Thai)
Porque tú lo vales (Spanish)
Dbaj o siebie (Polish)

List of spokespeople
L'Oréal Paris has a group of ambassadors, artists, actresses, and activists referred to as the L'Oreal Paris "Dream Team".

Laetitia Casta (1998–present)
Eva Longoria (2005–present)
Aishwarya Rai (2004–present)
Helen Mirren (2014–present)
Luma Grothe (2015–present)
Soo Joo (2015–present)
Aja Naomi King (2017–present)
Camilla Cabello (2017–present)
Elle Fanning (2017–present)
Amber Heard (2018–present)
Andie MacDowell (2018–present)
Duckie Thot (2018–present)
Jaha Dukureh (2018–present)
Céline Dion (2019–present)
Cindy Bruna (2020–present)
Katherine Langford (2020–present)
Viola Davis (2021–present)
Kate Winslet (2021–present)
H.E.R. (2022–present)

Corporate affairs

Head office
L'Oréal Group has its head office in the Centre Eugène Schueller in Clichy, Hauts-de-Seine, close to Paris. The building, constructed in the 1970s from brick and steel, replaced the former Monsavon factory, and employees moved into the facility in 1978. 1,400 employees work in the building. In 2005, Nils Klawitter of Der Spiegel said "the building, with its brown glazed façade of windows, is every bit as ugly as its neighbourhood." Klawitter added that the facility "gives the impression of a high-security zone" due to the CCTV cameras and security equipment. The world's largest hair salon is located inside the head office building. As of 2005, 90 hairdressers served 300 women, including retirees, students, and unemployed people, per day; the customers are used as test subjects for new hair colours.

International units include:

 L'Oréal USA, changed from Cosmair in 2000 - has its headquarters in New York City, and is responsible for operations in the Americas.
 L'Oréal Canada Incorporated - Canadian operations, based in Montreal
 L'Oréal Australia - head office is in Melbourne
 L'Oréal Nordic - head office is in Copenhagen, Denmark
 L'ORÉAL Deutschland GmbH - legal seat is in Karlsruhe, head office is in Düsseldorf

Corporate governance 
Jean-Paul Agon is the chairman and Nicolas Hieronimus the chief executive officer of L'Oréal. Françoise Bettencourt Meyers and Paul Bulcke are vice chairmen of the board of directors.

Stockholders
As of 31 December 2020:
 Breakdown of share ownership: 33.17% by the Bettencourt family, 23.20% by Nestlé, 29.6% by international institutional investors, 7.87% by French institutional investors, 4.59% by individual shareholders, 1.57% by employees.

Business figures

In 2003, L'Oréal announced its 19th consecutive year of double-digit growth. Its consolidated sales were  €14.029 bn and net profit was  €1.653 bn.  96.7% of sales derived from cosmetic activities and 2.5% from dermatological activities. L'Oréal has operations in over 130 countries, employing 50,500 people, 24% of which work in France.  3.3% of consolidated sales is invested in research and development, which accounts for 2,900 of its employees. In 2003, it applied for 515 patents. It operates 42 manufacturing plants throughout the world, which employ 14,000 people.

 Cosmetics sales by division breakdown: 54.8% from consumer products at  €7.506 bn, 25.1% from luxury products at  €3.441 bn, 13.9% from professional products at  €1.9 bn, and 5.5% from active cosmetics at  €0.749 bn.
 Cosmetic sales by geographic zone breakdown: 52.7% from Western Europe at  €7.221 bn, 27.6% from North America at  €3.784 bn, 19.7% from rest of the world at  €2.699 bn.

In 2007, L'Oréal was ranked 353 in the Fortune Global 500. The company had earned $2,585 million on sales of $19,811 million. There were 60,850 employees.

By 19 March 2016, the company had a share value of 89,542 million euros, distributed in 562,983,348 shares. Its reported operating profit in 2016 was €4.54 bn, based on revenue of €25.8 bn.

Joint ventures and minority interests
L'Oréal holds 10.41% of the shares of Sanofi-Aventis, the world's number three and Europe's number one pharmaceutical company. The Laboratoires Innéov is a joint venture in nutritional cosmetics between L'Oréal and Nestlé; they draw on Nestlé's knowledge in the fields of nutrition and food safety.

Corporate social responsibility

Group-wide sustainability plan
In 2013, L'Oreal announced a new sustainability plan it called "Sharing Beauty With All", committing to reduce the environmental impact of all products. According to Marketing Week, L'Oreal's pledges included  "aiming for 100 per cent of its products to have an environmental or social benefit; reducing the company's environmental footprint by 60 per cent; empowering “every L’Oréal consumer to make sustainable consumption choices while enhancing the beauty of the planet”; and giving L’Oréal employees access to healthcare, social protection and training wherever they are in the world."

In 2021, L'Oreal launches a new sustainability plan "L'Oreal for the future" which contains a series of goals to achieve within 2030 on topics such as biodiversity, resource management, climate change and circularity.

Sustainable development
In 2009, L'Oréal declared their intention to cut greenhouse gas emissions, water consumption, and waste by 50% over the period 2005-2015 – a reduction in carbon dioxide emissions that is to be in part achieved by the use of solar panels, biogas and electricity and hot water produced from the combustion of methane gas recovered from agricultural waste. In 2012, the company declared a 37.1% reduction in CO2 emissions, a 24% reduction in water consumption and a 22% deduction in transportable waste, and was named a sector leader by Climate Counts for its practices and achievements in the management of carbon emissions.
In 2014, L'Oréal made the commitment to ensure that none of its products were linked to deforestation, and to source 100% renewable raw materials by 2020. The group was included in the Corporate Knights "Global 100" list of the 100 most sustainable companies.

Position on animal testing
Since the 1980s, L'Oréal has invested €900 million in researching alternatives to animal testing for product safety, using methods such as reconstructed skin models, such as the Episkin model at their research centres in Gerland, France, and Pudong, China.

Nevertheless, this is complicated by markets such as China, where it is difficult to get sell a beauty product without it being tested by animals. Cosmetics by brands such as The Body Shop, which refuse to do animal testing, are thus not sold in China.

In 2013, L'Oréal was part of a consortium calling on the EU to invest more in research on alternatives to animal testing.

Promoting new methods for plastic recycling
In 2020, L'Oreal announced a cooperation with French biochemistry pioneer Carbios, aiming to establish a method of dissolving plastic waste by using enzymes.

Ukraine war 
In 2022, L’Oréal Paris donated €1 million ($1.09 million) to charities supporting refugees from the 2022 Russian invasion of Ukraine. L’Oréal Paris also suspended all commercial activity in Russia, both retail and wholesale. The company also supplies hygiene products to hospitals, maternity homes, centers with forcibly displaced persons, homes for the elderly, the military, etc. L’Oréal Paris financially support employees in Ukraine, guaranteeing the payment of wages and providing additional financial assistance, and provide accommodation for employees who are abroad and assist with temporary employment in other L'Oréal branches.

Community involvement and awards
In 2014, L'Oreal was listed 61st among 1200 of India's most trusted brands according to the Brand Trust Report 2014, a study conducted by Trust Research Advisory, a brand analytics company.

In 2008, L'Oréal was named Europe's top business employer by the European Student Barometer,  a survey conducted by Trendence that covers 20 European countries and incorporates the responses of over 91,000 students.

The L'Oréal-UNESCO Awards for Women in Science was established to improve the position of women in science by recognizing outstanding women researchers who have contributed to scientific progress.

The awards are a result of a partnership between the French cosmetics company L'Oréal and the United Nations Educational, Scientific and Cultural Organization (UNESCO) and carry a grant of US$100,000 for each laureate.

The same partnership awards the UNESCO-L'Oréal International Fellowships, providing up to US$40,000 in funding over two years to fifteen young women scientists engaged in exemplary and promising research projects.

L'Oréal organises the yearly L'Oréal Brandstorm, a business game for students in 46 countries. The game is related to marketing and has a first prize of $10,000, the second prize of $5,000 and the third prize of $2500.

L'Oréal is also a founding member of the "Look Good ... Feel Better" project, a charity which was formed over 16 years ago to help women combat the visible side effects of cancer treatment.

L'Oréal also holds a global competition known as "L'Oréal Brandstorm" each year to invite students from around the world to be creative, innovative, and build their own business plans based around different topics (for example: Brandstorm 2019 was about sustainability).

In 2015, Standard Ethics Aei gave a rating to L'Oreal in order to include it in its Standard Ethics French Index.

Research and innovation

Episkin
Episkin is a reconstructed skin model developed by engineers at L'Oréal France to provide an alternative to animal testing. Human skin cells leftover from breast surgery are developed under in vitro laboratory conditions to form sheets of reconstructed skin. This has advantages over animal testing other than the sparing of animals: it can be adapted to create reconstructions of a range of skin colors, as well as younger and older skin, meaning that safety tests give more relevant results for humans.
In 2006, the Episkin division acquired SkinEthic, a leading tissue engineering company.

The aim for L'Oréal is to produce products that cater to their diverse customers specifically, in the emerging markets that currently account for 53% of the entire global beauty market. Through these research methods L'Oréal aims to tap into one billion new consumers in these markets for the upcoming years.

In 2003, the L'Oréal Institute for Ethnic Hair & Skin Research was inaugurated in Chicago to continue their research on African American hair and skin among other ethnicities. The L'Oréal Group opened the Predictive Evaluation Center in Lyon, France in 2011. This center is devoted to evaluating the quality of the products without testing on animals. Additionally, L'Oréal built an international "Consumer Insights" division as well as, regional Research and Innovation centres in six countries: Japan, China, India, the United States, Brazil, and France. The aim of these centres is to collect information on their diverse consumers in order to develop products according to their various needs.  In 2011, L'Oréal announced its intention to build a Research and Innovation Center in Bom Jesus Island Rio de Janeiro, Brazil. Estimated at 30 million euros (70 million reais), this project is expected to create about 150 jobs by 2015.

The L'Oreal Global Hair Research Centre, a facility in Paris Saint-Ouen, opened in March 2012. It serves as the headquarters for the international departments of hair color, hair care, and hairstyling. One of the largest investments in company R&I history, the 25,000m² Centre hosts 500 employees. These include chemists, physical-chemists, opticians, materials scientists, metrologists, rheologists, computer scientists, and statisticians. The facility offers automation, modelling, and sensory evaluation.

Human skin 3D printing
L'Oreal announced in May 2015 that it was partnering with bioprinting startup Organovo to figure out how to 3D print living, breathing derma that can be used to test products for toxicity and efficacy. "We're the first beauty company that Organovo has worked with", said Guive Balooch, global vice president of L'Oreal's tech incubator.

Modiface
On 16 March 2018, L'Oréal announced that it had acquired Modiface, a beauty tech company that uses augmented reality to allow users to digitally try on different makeup products and hairstyles. Later in 2020, L'Oréal Paris introduced their first line of virtual makeup for social media platforms called "Signature Faces", an augmented reality filter for Instagram, Snapchat, Snap Camera, and Google Duo. It was in part marketed as a way to engage consumers spending more time online due to the pandemic, as well as a way for consumers to try on makeup at home for online shopping.

Perso
This smart device creates custom formulas for lipstick, foundation, and skin care. Customers can use it through the Perso app, which uses AI technology, and is expected to get launched in 2021.

Hapta 
At CES 2023, L'Oréal introduced its newly-developed innovation, Hapta. This product, Hapta, consists of a 'computerized makeup applicator' which is devoted to people with limited hand and arm mobility. Indeed, it facilitates for them the process of applying lipstick. This new applicator would able to 'mimic' different movements of a beauty routine through 'customizable accessories'. The motive behind this innovation is to meet the beauty needs of people with limited hand and arm mobility. According to L'Oréal, Hapta is expected to be launched by Lancôme in 2023.

L'Oréal brow magic 
Another innovation by L'Oréal was announced at CES 2023 which is L'Oreal Brow Magic. This innovation is considered to be the 'first at-home' electronic applicator to facilitate eyebrow-makeup. In fact, it offers its users with immediate special and 'bespoke' brows.

Controversy

Involvement in conflicts
Eugène Schueller, the company's founder, was an alleged Nazi sympathizer. L'Oréal concedes that Schueller was an antisemitic fascist.  He was also a member of La Cagoule, which supported the Vichy regime, and was a violent, pro-fascist and anti-communist organisation.  Eugène bankrolled La Cagoule and some meetings of La Cagoule were held at L'Oréal headquarters. Some of the criminal activities perpetrated by La Cagoule include firearms transportation, assassinating a former minister, and firebombing six synagogues.

Other controversy arose when Jean Frydman, a shareholder and board member of Paravision, a film subsidiary of L'Oréal, was fired. He claims that he was let go because L'Oréal wanted to avoid an Arab boycott of businesses associated with Jews. In turn, Frydman decided to expose the past of L'Oréal executives. André Bettencourt who married Schueller's daughter, Liliane Bettencourt, and became deputy chairman for L'Oréal, wrote 60 articles for La Terre Française. La Terre Française was an antisemitic Nazi propaganda sheet. André has admitted ownership of the propaganda but claimed he was poisoned by the Vichy regime and said, "I have repeatedly expressed my regrets concerning them in public and will always beg the Jewish community to forgive me for them." André Bettencourt also sheltered Schueller and several collaborators from the French Resistance after Liberation. It was also revealed that Eugène Schueller hired Jacques Correze, who was the honorary head of L'Oréal's U.S. affiliate, Cosmair, and was involved with La Cagoule.

Further controversy arose when it was revealed that L'Oréal had its German headquarters for over 30 years, before being sold in 1991, on land confiscated from a Jewish family during World War II. The Jewish family has been battling for restitution from the company for three generations, the latest of which is Edith Rosenfelder, a Holocaust survivor. Fritz Rosenfelder was forced to sell the house to a Nazi official, of which the family never received the proceeds of the sale. Instead, the family was deported. The Allies passed Jewish restitution legislation which states that transactions with Nazis, even if appearing to be with the owner's consent, can be considered invalid. As the land was sold to an offshoot of L'Oréal, which was later bought out in 1961 by L'Oréal, the company claims that it is not responsible for anything that happened before then. The basis for Rosenfelder's argument is that since the original sale was illegal, all subsequent sales are equally unlawful. There was restitution paid in 1951 to the Jewish Restitution Successor Organization, though this was done without the family's consent and none of the money ever reached the family. A book by Monica Waitzfelder, daughter of Edith Rosenfelder, published in French as L'Oréal a pris ma maison and in English as L'Oréal stole my house!, details how L'Oréal took over the Waitzfelder home in the German city of Karlsruhe (after the Nazis had engineered the removal of the family) to make it its German headquarters.  Monica Waitzfelder is quoted as saying, "All the other businesses which took Jewish property have since returned it, without any great debate. I don't understand why L'Oréal should be any different from the others." A case was brought before the Supreme Court in France, but the public prosecutor ruled that there could be no trial.  As of 2007, she is bringing the case to the European Court of Human Rights.

On 31 July 2014 during Operation Protective Edge launched by the Israel Defense Forces (IDF) in the Gaza Strip, the Israel advocacy organisation StandWithUs posted several Facebook photos of care packages, which they said were donated by Garnier Israel to female IDF soldiers. This sparked several calls to boycott Garnier and L'Oréal worldwide. As of  no official statement was made by Garnier or L'Oréal regarding the donation.

On March 4, 2022, L'Oréal announced €1 mln donation for relief support of Ukrainians who suffer from the 2022 Russian invasion of Ukraine.

Animal testing
L'Oréal began in vitro tissue testing in 1979, and does not test any of its products or ingredients on animals anywhere in the world since 1989–14 years before it was required by regulation. Controversy came from the fact that L'Oréal sells products in China, whose regulators conduct animal testing on cosmetics to be sold within its territory. Even though a ban on animal testing in China came into effect in January 2020, Chinese authorities still perform this practice for imported "ordinary" cosmetics.

Following L'Oréal's 2006 purchase of The Body Shop, which does not support animal testing, The Body Shop's founder Anita Roddick was forced to defend herself against allegations of "abandoning her principles" over L'Oréal's involvement on animal testing. Calls were made for shoppers to boycott The Body Shop. L'Oréal sold The Body Shop to Brazilian group Natura Cosméticos in 2017.

Discrimination
On 11 August 2005, the Supreme Court of California ruled that former L'Oréal sales manager Elyse Yanowitz had adequately pleaded a cause of action for retaliatory termination under the California Fair Employment and Housing Act, and remanded the case for trial. The case arose out of a 1997 incident in which Jack Wiswall, then the general manager for designer fragrances, allegedly told Yanowitz to fire a dark-skinned sales associate despite the associate's good performance. When Yanowitz refused, Wiswall pointed to a "sexy" blonde-haired woman and said, "God damn it, get me one that looks like that." Wiswall retired as president of the luxury products division of L'Oréal USA at the end of 2006.

The company has recently faced discrimination lawsuits in France related to the hiring of spokesmodels and institutional racism. In July 2007, the Garnier division and an external employment agency were fined €30,000 for recruitment practices that intentionally excluded non-white women from promoting its hair wash, "Fructis Style". L'Oréal is reported as saying the decision was "incomprehensible", and would challenge the measure in court.

L'Oréal continues to sell skin whitening products, which have been criticized as "capitalising on women's insecurities due to colourism." They advertise these controversial products, which have been criticised for promoting a colonial attitude as well as having safety concerns, on their website by claiming; "Achieve clear, translucent and radiant skin. Our skin whitening products work to fade dark spots and brighten skin to give you the fair, flawless complexion you desire."

False advertising
In May 2007, L'Oréal was one of several cosmetic manufacturers (along with Clinique, Estee Lauder, Payot, Lancôme) ordered by the Therapeutic Goods Administration in Australia to withdraw advertising regarding the wrinkle removal capabilities of their products.

In the UK, L'Oréal has faced criticism from OFCOM regarding the truth of their advertising and marketing campaigns concerning the product performance of one of their mascara brands. In July 2007, the British Advertising Standards Authority attacked L'Oréal for a television advert on its "Telescopic" mascara, featuring Penélope Cruz, stating, "it will make your eyelashes 60% longer." In fact, it only made the lashes look 60% bigger, by separating and thickening at the roots and by thickening the tips of the lashes. They also failed to state that the model was wearing false eyelashes.

In July 2011, the British Advertising Standards Authority took action against L'Oréal, banning two airbrushed Lancôme advertisements in the UK featuring actress Julia Roberts and supermodel Christy Turlington. The agency issued the ban after British politician Jo Swinson argued that the two ads misrepresented reality and added to the self-image problem amongst females in the UK. L'Oréal acknowledged that the photos had been airbrushed but argued that the two cosmetic products could actually produce the results depicted in the ads and that the results of the products had been scientifically proven.

In June 2014, the company reached an agreement with the U.S. Federal Trade Commission not to make claims about its anti-aging products unless it had credible scientific evidence supporting the claims. The settlement followed an investigation by the commission into claims being made in relation to two products, which the commission described as "false and unsubstantiated".

L'Oréal has a team of 400 members of staff who post content to Facebook every day, according to Marc Menesguen, the company's chief marketing officer.

Patent Lawsuit 
In July 2017, the University of Massachusetts Medical filed a patent lawsuit against L'Oréal. In August 2017, Dennis Wyrzykowski and his company, Carmel Laboratories LLC, joined the lawsuit. The two parties claimed that L'Oréal's brands used UMass' patented technology for skin creams with the chemical adenosine. In 2021, a judge found the patents invalid. In 2022, the U.S. Appeals Court reversed the decision, stating that UMass could continue to purse its lawsuit.

Corporate misconduct
L'Oréal was fined by Autorité de la concurrence in France in 2016 for price-fixing on personal hygiene products.

Munroe Bergdorf

In August 2017, L'Oréal dismissed Munroe Bergdorf, a mixed-race transgender model, after she responded to the Unite the Right rally in Charlottesville, Virginia, by stating in a Facebook post: "Honestly I don't have the energy to talk about the racial violence of white people any more. Yes ALL white people"; the post was also quoted as saying that "[white people's] existence, privilege and success as a race is built on the backs, blood and death of people of colour", "racism isn't learned, it's inherited and ... passed down through privilege" and that "white people" ought to "begin to admit that their race is the most violent and oppressive force of nature on Earth". Shortly after terminating Bergdorf, L'Oréal released a statement claiming their commitment to "[support] diversity and tolerance towards all people irrespective of their race, background, gender and religion" and had terminated their partnership with Bergdorf because her comments were "at odds with those values".

Amber Heard 
In 2018, L'Oréal Paris hired Amber Heard as a Global Ambassador, also giving a special tribute to her. In 2020, after a tape leaked of Heard admitting to having hit her ex-husband Johnny Depp, several petitions were filed requesting L'Oreal to fire her. As of June 2021, L'Oreal continued to include Heard among a team of "ambassadors" that also includes Kate Winslet, Jane Fonda, Elle Fanning, and French singer-songwriter Yseult. Heard was being sued in a defamation trial by her ex-husband, Johnny Depp in which he accused her of domestic abuse. She was found to have defamed her ex-husband with malice on June 2, 2022 by a jury; Heard is currently appealing her case.

Brands portfolio

Brands are generally categorized by their targeted markets, such as the mass, professional, luxury, and active cosmetics markets. The Body Shop and Galderma are directly attached to the head office. L'Oréal also owns interests in various activities such as fine chemicals, health, finance, design, advertising, and insurance.

Consumer Products Division

 3ce
 Carol's Daughter
 Colorama
 Créateurs de Beauté
 Essie
 Garnier
 L'Oréal Paris
 Magic
 Maybelline
 Niely
 NYX Cosmetics
 SoftSheen-Carson

L'Oréal Luxe Division

 Atelier Cologne
 Biotherm
 Cacharel
 Clarisonic (Discontinued September 30, 2020)
 Diesel
 Giorgio Armani Beauty
 Guy Laroche
 Helena Rubinstein
 House 99
 IT Cosmetics
 Kiehl's
 Lancôme
 MUGLER
 Paloma Picasso
 Proenza Schouler
 Ralph Lauren Fragrances
 Shu Uemura
 Urban Decay
 Valentino Beauty
 Viktor & Rolf
 Yue Sai
 Yves Saint Laurent Beauté

Professional Products Division

 L'Oréal Technique
 L'Oréal Professionnel, including ARTec and Innate
 Kérastase (created by L'Oreal in 1964)
 Kéraskin Esthetics, created by L'Oreal in 2007 and specialising in skin care professionals
 Matrix Essentials, founded by Arnie Miller in 1980 and acquired by L'Oreal in 2000
 Mizani, founded in 1991 and bought by L'Oreal in 2001
 PureOlogy Research, founded in 2001 and acquired by L'Oreal in 2007
 Redken 5th Avenue NYC, founded by Paula Kent and Jheri Redding in 1960 and acquired by L'Oreal in 1993
 Shu Uemura Art of Hair
 Carol's Daughter
 Carita
 Essie, founded in 1981 and acquired by L'Oreal in 2010
 Decléor
 Botanicals Fresh Care
 Cheryl's Cosmeceuticals

Active Cosmetics Division

 Vichy
 La Roche-Posay
 Skinceuticals
 Roger&Gallet - sold in 2020
 Sanoflore
 Dermablend
 AcneFree
 Ambi
 CeraVe
 Logocos since 2018

References

External links 

 

 
CAC 40
Chemical companies established in 1909
Companies in the Euro Stoxx 50
Companies listed on Euronext Paris
Cosmetics brands
Cosmetics companies of France
French brands
French business families
French companies established in 1909
History of cosmetics
Multinational companies headquartered in France
Nail polish
Personal care companies